Line 3 of the Changchun Rail Transit is a light rail line running from northwest to southeast Changchun. It was opened on 30 October 2002. Line 3 was later extended on 26 December 2006 and 31 December 2021.

Opening timeline

Future Development
A Southern extension from Changchun Movie Wonderland to No.59 Middle School is under planning.

Service routes
  — 
  —

Stations

See also
Changchun Rail Transit

Notes

References

Changchun Rail Transit lines
Railway lines opened in 2002
2002 establishments in China
750 V DC railway electrification